J. Austin Ranney (September 23, 1920 – July 24, 2006) was an American political scientist and expert on political parties in the United States.

Ranney earned his bachelor's degree at Northwestern University, his master's degree at the University of Oregon, and his Ph.D. at Yale University. He taught for many years at the University of Illinois and the University of Wisconsin–Madison, before coming to the University of California, Berkeley in 1986, where he stayed through the remainder of his career.

According to political journalist Theodore H. White, it was Ranney who, in a Nov. 18, 1969, hearing designed to reform the delegate selection process of the Democratic Party, "set... in motion" the idea of quota set-asides, though Ranney "consistently ever since...has expressed his abhorrence of quotas." White attributes the quota system eventually adopted by the McGovern–Fraser Commission as "one of the major factors in the wrecking" of the campaign of George McGovern as the 1972 Democratic presidential candidate and the landslide re-election of Richard Nixon.

He served as president of the American Political Science Association in 1974–1975, and also served as managing editor of the American Political Science Review. He was a Guggenheim fellow (in 1974), and a scholar at the American Enterprise Institute (1976–1985). He was politically a Democrat.

Ranney was a longtime affiliate of political science honors society Pi Sigma Alpha. He was president of the society from 1976 to 1978, and also served on the executive council for the ten years prior. He was inducted into Pi Sigma Alpha as a college student.

He created the Ranney Index, and is also noted for his work on preselection in British parliamentary elections (1965).

His influences included Elmer Eric Schattschneider and Angus Campbell, while his Ph.D. students include Douglas W. Rae.

Works 
 Austin Ranney, Pathways to Parliament. Candidate Selection in Britain, Macmillan, London, 1965.

References

External links
 

American political scientists
Northwestern University alumni
University of Oregon alumni
Yale University alumni
University of Illinois faculty
University of Wisconsin–Madison faculty
University of California faculty
1920 births
2006 deaths
Corresponding Fellows of the British Academy
20th-century political scientists